4-Hydroxy-N-methyl-N-propyltryptamine, commonly known as 4-HO-MPT or meprocin, is a psychedelic drug in the tryptamine class of chemical compounds and is a higher homologue of the naturally occurring substituted tryptamine psilocin as well as being the 4-hydroxyl analog of MPT.

History
4-HO-MPT was first synthesized and bioassayed by biochemist Alexander Shulgin and written about in his 1994 book TiHKAL.

Dosage and duration
For psychedelic effects, the dosage and duration are listed as "unknown" in TiHKAL.

Effects
Very little data exists about the pharmacological properties, metabolism, and toxicity of 4-HO-MPT.  In a single trial of 8 mg orally of 4-HO-MPT HCl from TiHKAL, it is described as producing visual distortion, vertigo, and slight insomnia.

Legal status
4-HO-MPT is not scheduled by the United Nations' Convention on Psychotropic Substances.

United States
4-HO-MPT is not scheduled at the federal level in the United States, but it is possible that 4-HO-MPT could legally be considered an analog of psilocin, in which case, sales or possession with intent for human consumption could potentially be prosecuted under the Federal Analogue Act.

References

External links 
 4-HO-MPT Entry in TIHKAL @ Erowid.org
 4-HO-MPT entry in TiHKAL • info

Tryptamines
Psychedelic tryptamines
Tertiary amines
Designer drugs